The canton of Saint-Yrieix-la-Perche is an administrative division of the Haute-Vienne department, western France. Its borders were modified at the French canton reorganisation which came into effect in March 2015. Its seat is in Saint-Yrieix-la-Perche.

It consists of the following communes:
 
Bussière-Galant
Les Cars
Le Chalard
Châlus
Flavignac
Glandon
Janailhac
Ladignac-le-Long
Lavignac
Meilhac
La Meyze
Nexon
Pageas
Rilhac-Lastours
La Roche-l'Abeille
Saint-Hilaire-les-Places
Saint-Yrieix-la-Perche

References

Cantons of Haute-Vienne